Steve Cartwright is an American video game designer. He is best known as one of the original Activision game designers, credited with such games as Barnstorming, Megamania, Seaquest and Hacker.

Activision
In 1982, Cartwright joined college classmate David Crane as the fifth game designer/programmer at Activision where he developed the following games: 
 Barnstorming
 Megamania
 Seaquest
 Plaque Attack
 Frostbite
 Hacker
 Hacker II
 Aliens
 Air Rally

Accolade
In 1988, Cartwright joined Activision founders Alan Miller and Bob Whitehead at Accolade. Among his products were the Sierra-style graphic adventures Les Manley in: Search for the King and Les Manley in: Lost in L.A.—the first game to use live actors captured in front of a blue screen.

Electronic Arts
In 1993, Cartwright joined Electronic Arts. He soon took over producer responsibility on the fledgling PGA Tour line and helped redesign the NBA Live product line. Among the many innovations to the golf line were the first use of digitized golfers, the first EA golf product with 3D terrain, and the first use of a targeting arc and putting guides in a golf product.

In 1999, Cartwright designed and produced Tiger Woods '99. Additionally, Cartwright designed the product to include 1-button access to a game server and match server—making this EA's first online multiplayer sports game. Later, with the addition of the "Play Against The Pros" feature, Cartwright was awarded co-patent holder rights to the technology that eventually became the basis of the PGA Tour Shotlink technology.
 PGA Tour 486
 NBA Live 95
 PGA Tour 96
 PGA Tour Pro
 Tiger Woods 99
 Tiger Woods 2000

Glu Mobile
In 2002, Cartwright joined Scott Orr as an internal developer at Glu Mobile, originally known as Sorrent. After a 10-year hiatus from programming, Cartwright developed six of Sorrent's first eight products. During the 2004 presidential election, Cartwright took his previous product FOX Sports Boxing and turned it into Bush vs. Kerry Boxing. He was later named Director of Production where products he designed, produced, or otherwise developed accounted for up to 70% of Glu Mobile revenue.

 FOX Sports Football
 FOX Sports Basketball
 FOX Sports Boxing
 FOX Sports Track & Field
 Yao Ming Basketball
 Atari's DRIV3R
 Deerhunter
 Bush vs. Kerry Boxing
 ZUMA
 Kingdom of Heaven
 Robots
 Diner Dash
 DRIVER: Vegas

Later career
In 2006, Cartwright joined TV Head—later known as TAG Networks—as Executive Producer. TAG was a games-on-demand television network.

In 2008, Cartwright spent several months developing and pursuing VC funding for a Kid's MMO in the vein of Club Penguin. This endeavor was abandoned when he joined Slipgate Ironworks The company later became Gazillion Entertainment.

In 2009, Cartwright joined former colleagues Adam Bellin and Sam Nelson in project design to make sports statistics fun and entertaining. The first project, Streakwise Draft Tracker 2011, reached #2 on the App Store.

In 2010, Cartwright joined RockYou as GM of the Redwood City Games Studio. In his first few weeks, he recruited John Yoo, lead designer on Zynga's CityVille, and helped RockYou establish a relationship with John Romero and his new company, Loot Drop. After managing through a difficult transition period following the layoff of nearly 1/3 of the company, Cartwright became Sr. Director of Design. He then worked closely with Executive Producer Jennifer Gee on the launch of RockYou's Zoo World 2 Facebook project.

More recently, Cartwright lead the design of Bluescape's real-time cloud-based collaboration system. The Bluescape "wall" is currently being used by Lucas Film to plan and storyboard future Star Wars films.

References

External links 
Cartwright's personal website
Cartwright's profile on MobyGames

American video game designers
Living people
Year of birth missing (living people)